Herbert Knott Sorrell (April 18, 1897 – May 7, 1973) was an American labor leader and Hollywood union organizer. He headed the Conference of Studio Unions (CSU) in the late 1940s, and was the business manager of the Motion Picture Painters union, Local 644 until the 1950s.

Early life
At 12. he found employment in a sewer pipe factory in Oakland, California, and later in Oakland he worked with union leader Harry Bridges. At one point he tried boxing as a career. He moved to Los Angeles in 1925, became a scenery painter for the movie studios, and joined the local painters union. In April 1937, his union local was one of those unaffiliated with IATSE which formed the Federation of Motion Picture Crafts (FMPC). The same month, the FMPC went on strike against the major studios. In the picket line at Warner Brothers, Sorrell's determination earned him the rank of "picket captain", and the attention of Blayney F. Mathews, head of Warner Brothers' security, who had him arrested. He was never charged and was released several days later. This notoriety led to his subsequent position as the business representative for the painter's union and as a result he became one of the major negotiators who settled the strike in June.

Conference of Studio Unions
In May 1941, Sorrell called for a strike against the Disney film studio. The strike was supported by the newly formed Screen Cartoonist's Guild, and the cooperation resulted in the organization of the Conference of Studio Unions (CSU), which Sorrell proceeded to lead.

In 1945, Sorrell lead the CSU strike that led to Hollywood Black Friday. The strike originated from a dispute between two unions, CSU and IATSE, over which one of them had union authority over 77 set decorators. After an National Labor Relations Board vote and War Labor Board decision in favor of CSU, the studios refused to recognize CSU's bargaining authority, and the strike began. After violence on Black Friday, the strike quickly settled. However, collusion between the IATSE leadership and the studios resulted in another strike in September 1946, which the CSU did not have the financial strength to endure. Sorrell was convicted of "contempt of court" and "failure to disperse" in connection with the 1945 strike but acquitted of all of the felony charges. which included "inciting to riot" and "rioting."

Communist ties
In 1941 and again in 1946, Sorrell testified before the California Legislature's Joint Fact-Finding Committee on Un-American Activities (the Tenney Committee), but there was insufficient evidence that he was tied to the Communist Party. The CSU strike of 1945, which Sorrell had led, was actively opposed by the Communist Party USA. In 1947, Walt Disney testified before the House Committee on Un-American Activities that he "believed at that time that Mr. Sorrell was a Communist because of all the things that I had heard and having seen his name appearing on a number of Commie front things."

Sorrell is also responsible for the rumor of Disney's anti-Semitism, possibly as retaliation for testifying to the committee on Un-American Activities. In 1953, in an actor's lawsuit, Sorrell testified that he was never a communist, but he felt free to spend communist money.

References

Sources
 Pintar, Laurie C. (1996) "Herbert K. Sorrell as the grade-B hero: militancy and masculinity in the studios" Labor History 37(Summer): pp. 392–416
 "Painters Strengthen Labor Ties" in December 1941 Screen Actor Magazine.

External links
 Excerpt from Reagan's War: The Epic Story of His Forty-Year Struggle and Final Triumph Over Communism by Peter Schweizer Washington Post November 25, 2002;
 "Review of Class Struggle In Hollywood, 1930-1950: Moguls, Mobsters, Stars, Reds, & Trade Unionists" Politics and Culture by Amitava Kumar and Michael Ryan;

1897 births
1973 deaths
Victims of McCarthyism
Trade unionists from California
People from Henry County, Missouri